The Elwren Formation is a geologic formation in Kentucky. It preserves fossils dating back to the Carboniferous period.

See also
 List of fossiliferous stratigraphic units in Kentucky

References

 

Carboniferous Kentucky
Carboniferous southern paleotropical deposits